Modestobacter multiseptatus is an aerobic bacterium from the genus Modestobacter which has been isolated from soil from the Linnaeus Terrace from the Transantarctic Mountains of Antarctica.

References

Bacteria described in 2000
Actinomycetia